An implied trust is an element of trust law, and refers to a trust that has not been "expressly created by the settlor." There are two types of implied trust:

Resulting trust
Constructive trust

References

Common law
Wills and trusts
Equity (law)
Inheritance